TV Mar is the brand name for three television stations operating in western Mexico, owned and operated by CPS Media.

History

The TV Mar stations were awarded in the IFT-6 television station auction of 2017. Corporación Periodística Sudcaliforniana, S.A. de C.V. paid 5.179 million and 5.019 million pesos, respectively, for the stations in La Paz and Los Cabos, Baja California Sur. However, a bidding war arose for the third station CPS would obtain, at Puerto Vallarta, with CPS's winning bid of 20.179 million pesos coming in the 21st subsequent round of the auction.

Facility construction for the TV Mar stations was contemporaneous with the Radiante FM stations that CPS had previously won in all three cities in the IFT-4 radio auction (XHPLPZ-FM, XHPSJC-FM and XHPVBB-FM). The first station to begin operations was Puerto Vallarta, which began program service on December 3, 2018. The La Paz station entered program service on February 18, 2019, followed by Los Cabos on October 28, 2019.

Programming
TV Mar is a general-entertainment television station with a wide variety of programming. Much of TV Mar's entertainment programming is sourced from Televisión Española, including series and children's programming. Other content comes from the state networks of Morelos and Veracruz and other independent producers. TV Mar launched in Puerto Vallarta with a series of local programs, including Por una Causa (For a Cause), a show spotlighting civil society organizations in the region; La Receta, featuring local chefs; and a music show, Por Fin es Viernes, on Friday nights.

News

TV Mar broadcasts four and a half hours of local news each weekday on CPS Noticias, simulcast on Radiante FM. There is no local news on weekends.

Stations

The TV Mar system consists of three stations, all broadcasting on virtual channel 10. XHCPCS-TDT has two transmitters.

References

External links
TV Mar station websites:
Puerto Vallarta
La Paz
Los Cabos

Television stations in Baja California Sur
Television stations in Jalisco
Television channels and stations established in 2018
2018 establishments in Mexico